Kimonas "Kimon" Kokorogiannis (Greek: Κίμωνας "Κίμων" Κοκορόγιαννης) (born 26 September 1953) is a former Greek professional basketball player. He played basketball professionally in the Greek Basket League.

Playing career
Kokorogiannis joined Olympiacos Piraeus for the 1974–75 season. He played with Olympiacos through the 1982–83 season, and with them, he won two Greek League championships (1976, 1978), and four Greek Cups (1976, 1977, 1978, 1980). He also played in all three league tier levels of European-wide club basketball, playing in the 3rd-tier level FIBA Korać Cup, the 2nd-tier level FIBA Saporta Cup, and the top-tier level EuroLeague. He also played with the Greek League club Panellinios.

Awards and Accomplishments

2× Greek League Champion: (1976, 1978)
4× Greek Cup Winner: (1976, 1977, 1978, 1980)

References

External links
Hellenic Basketball Federation Profile 

1953 births
Living people
Greek men's basketball players
Greek Basket League players
Olympiacos B.C. players
Panellinios B.C. players